This is a list of notable events in the history of LGBT rights that took place in the year 1997.

Events
 Sodomy is decriminalized in the People's Republic of China.
 Fiji becomes the second country in the world whose constitution explicitly protects against discrimination based on sexual orientation, although the Fijian government does not invalidate or repeal its sodomy laws.
 U.S. state of Maine bans sexual orientation discrimination in the private sector.  The ban is later repealed in a referendum.
 U.S. state of New Hampshire bans sexual orientation discrimination in the private sector.

April
 30 — Ellen DeGeneres's character Ellen Morgan comes out as gay in "The Puppy Episode", seen by 42 million viewers.

July
 2 — District judge Eugene Nickerson in Abel v. United States of America, a challenge to "don't ask, don't tell", rules that the law in its entirety violates the First and Fifth Amendment to the United States Constitution.

October
 3 — An Ontario, Canada court rules that the Government of Ontario's Insurance Act must include same-sex partners in its definition of spouse.

November
 25 — Homosexuality is decriminalized in Ecuador following a landmark decision handed down by the Constitutional Tribunal.

December
Annise Parker is elected as an at-large member of the Houston City Council alongside mayoral candidate Lee P. Brown.
 2 — David Catania becomes the first openly gay or lesbian person to be elected to the city council of Washington, D.C.
 10 — The Constitution Review Committee in Florida votes 6–2 to reject adding sexual orientation as a criterion for protection in the state constitution.
 16 — In New Zealand, the court of appeal rules unanimously not to grant same-sex couples the right to marry.
 17 — In the U.S. state of New Jersey, same-sex couples are given the right to jointly adopt children.

See also

Timeline of LGBT history — timeline of events from 12,000 BCE to present
LGBT rights by country or territory — current legal status around the world
LGBT social movements

References

LGBT rights
LGBT rights by year
1997 in LGBT history